Valery Karnitsky (born 20 August 1991) is a Belarusian professional footballer.

His elder brother Alyaksandr Karnitsky is also a professional footballer.

Honours
Dinamo Brest
Belarusian Cup winner: 2016–17

References

External links 
 
 

1991 births
Living people
Belarusian footballers
Association football midfielders
FC Smolevichi players
FC Dynamo Brest players
FC Baranovichi players
FC Belshina Bobruisk players
FC Neman Stolbtsy players
FC Arsenal Dzerzhinsk players
People from Baranavichy
Sportspeople from Brest Region